Hour Jiunn-yih (born 11 March 1967) is a Taiwanese wrestler. He competed in the men's freestyle 48 kg at the 1988 Summer Olympics.

References

External links
 

1967 births
Living people
Taiwanese male sport wrestlers
Olympic wrestlers of Taiwan
Wrestlers at the 1988 Summer Olympics
Place of birth missing (living people)